Sara Tanaka (born November 21, 1978) is an American physician and former film actress. She is best known for her roles in Rushmore, Old School, and Race the Sun.

Biography
Tanaka was born in Huntington, New York. Her brother, Alessandro Tanaka, is a screenwriter and actor. She graduated from Brown University in 2000 with a degree in human biology.  She graduated from Pritzker School of Medicine at the University of Chicago in 2008 with an M.D. degree.  She completed her internal medicine residency program at the University of Chicago. She completed her cardiology fellowship program at the Beth Israel Deaconess Hospital in 2015.

Filmography

Film

Television

Video games

References

External links

1978 births
Living people
American film actresses
American women physicians
Brown University alumni
American actresses of Japanese descent
American film actors of Asian descent
American physicians of Japanese descent
Actresses from New York (state)
People from Long Island
Pritzker School of Medicine alumni
21st-century American women